French Braille is the original braille alphabet, and the basis of all others. The alphabetic order of French has become the basis of the international braille convention, used by most braille alphabets around the world. However, only the 25 basic letters of the French alphabet plus w have become internationalized; the additional letters are largely restricted to French Braille and the alphabets of some neighboring European countries.

Letters

In numerical order by decade, the letters are:

For the purposes of accommodating a foreign alphabet, the letters ì, ä, ò may be added: 

There are also numerous contractions and abbreviations in French braille.

Punctuation

Punctuation is as follows:

The lower values are readings within numbers (after the Antoine number marker: see below).

Formatting and mode
Formatting and mode-changing marks are:

As in English Braille, the capital sign is doubled for all caps.

The symbol marker combines with a following initial letter to produce the following: 
 §,  &,  ©,  ®,  ™,  % ( ‰,  ‱)

The currency marker combines with a following initial for: 
 ¥,  €,  $,  £

It is also used in comic strips:
 (speech bubble),  (thought bubble)

Numbers
The traditional system of digits is to add the number sign  in front of the letters of the first decade (a–j), with  being  and  being . This is the internationally recognized number system. However, in French Braille a new system, the Antoine braille digits, is used for mathematics and is recommended for all academic publications. The period/decimal and fraction bar also change. The Antoine numbers are being promoted in France and Luxembourg, but are not much used in with French Braille in Quebec.

{|class=wikitable
|+French Braille digits
|- align=center
!colspan=2| 
|0 ||1 ||2 ||3 ||4 ||5 ||6 ||7 ||8 ||9 
|-
!Traditional!!
|||||||||||||||||||
|-
!Antoine!!
|||||||||||||||||||
|}

See the punctuation section above for Antoine mathematical notation.

History

Readings have changed slightly since modern braille was first published in 1837. The greatest change has been various secondary readings which were added to the alphabet and then abandoned.

Similar alphabets
In general, only the assignments of the basic 26 letters of the French alphabet are retained in other braille alphabets. For example, among the additional letters, in German Braille only ü and ö coincide with French Braille. However, there are several alphabets which are much more closely related.  Italian Braille is identical to the French apart from doubling up French Braille ò to Italian ó and ò, since French has no ó.  Indeed, a principal difference of these alphabets is the remapping of French vowels with a grave accent (à è ì ò ù) to an acute accent (á é í ó ú), as the French alphabet does not support acute accents apart from é.  Spanish changes all five of these vowels, as well as taking ü.  Portuguese Braille is also very similar to the French, though the shift of grave to acute accents necessitated a chain of other changes, such as circumflex to grave, and the Portuguese tildes were taken from French diaereses (Portuguese ã õ for French ä ö/œ). The continental Scandinavian languages took the extended French letters â (for å), ä/æ, and ö/ø. Vietnamese Braille is also quite similar, though it has added tone letters, and uses French  z for d, which is pronounced like z. 

{|class=wikitable
|+Related alphabets
|- align=center
!Braille: 
|
|
|
|
|
|
|
|
|
|
|
|
|
|
|
|
|
|
|- align=center
! French
|ç||é||à||è||ù||â||ê||î||ô||û||ë||ï||ü||œ/ö||w||ì||æ/ä||ò
|- align=center
! Portuguese
|ç||é||à||è||ù||â||ê||í||ô||ú||á||ï||ü||õ||ò/w||ì||ã||ó
|- align=center
! Catalan
|ç||é||à||è||ú||–||–||–||–||–||–||ï||ü||ó||w||í||–||ò
|- align=center
! Spanish/Galician
|–||–||á||é||ú||–||–||–||–||–||–||ñ||ü||–||w||í||–||ó
|- align=center
! Italian
|–||é||à||è||ù||–||–||–||–||–||–||–||–||ó||w||ì||–||ò
|- align=center
! Luxembourgish (old)
|–||é||–||–||–||–||–||–||–||–||ë||–||–||–||w||–||ä||–
|- align=center
! Scandinavian
|–||–||–||–||–||å||–||–||–||–||–||–||–||ö/ø||w||–||ä/æ||–
|- align=center
! Vietnamese
|–||–||||–||||â||ê||–||ô||–||–||–||ư||ơ||–||||ă||
|-
! Braille Patterns
|⠯||⠿||⠷||⠮||⠾||⠡||⠣||⠩||⠹||⠱||⠫||⠻||⠳||⠪||⠺||⠌||⠜||⠬
|- align=center
|}

Catalan Braille adds  for print , and Spanish Braille uses  (French ï) for the non-French consonant ñ.  Luxembourgish Braille has since switch to eight-point braille, adding a dot at point 8 for the three vowels with accents. 

Punctuation and formatting are in general similar as well, though changes in French punctuation over time means that some languages use older French conventions.  For example, French parentheses and quotation marks originally had the opposite values they do today, values which remain in English Braille.  Other changes have accrued over time, and in some cases vary from country to country.  For example, Italian Braille uses the old French quotation marks  and asterisk , but also shifted the old French parentheses  to brackets and innovated  for parentheses; in addition, it uses point 3, for both apostrophe and full stop / period.

Moon type is a simplification of the Latin alphabet for embossing.
An adaptation of French-reading blind people has been proposed.

Notes

References

Sources

Code braille français uniformisé pour la transcription des textes imprimés (CBFU), 2nd edition, 2008
Code de transcription en braille des textes imprimes, 1999
 M. S. Loomis, 1942, The Braille Reference Book
 Pierre Henri, 1952, La vie et l'œvre de Louis Braille, PUF-GIAA, Paris

French-ordered braille alphabets
French language